Antonio Maria Priuli (1707–1772) was a Roman Catholic cardinal who served as Cardinal-Priest of San Marco (1762–1772), Bishop of Padova (1767–1772), Cardinal-Priest of Santa Maria della Pace (1759–1762), and Bishop of Vicenza (1738–1767).

References

External links and additional sources
 (for Chronology of Bishops) 
 (for Chronology of Bishops) 
 (for Chronology of Bishops) 
 (for Chronology of Bishops) 

18th-century Roman Catholic bishops in the Republic of Venice
1707 births
1772 deaths